Nebula is a genus of moths in the family Geometridae erected by Charles Théophile Bruand d'Uzelle in 1846.

Species
Nebula achromaria (La Harpe, 1853)
Nebula adlata (Staudinger, 1895)
Nebula apiciata (Staudinger, 1892)
Nebula approximata (Staudinger, 1881)
Nebula egenata (Prout, 1914)
Nebula eteocretica (Rebel, 1906)
Nebula ibericata (Staudinger, 1871)
Nebula ludificata (Staudinger, 1870)
Nebula mongoliata (Staudinger, 1892)
Nebula nebulata (Treitschke, 1828)
Nebula neogamata (Püngeler, 1908)
Nebula obvallata (Lederer, 1871)
Nebula petri (Prout, 1924)
Nebula propagata (Christoph, 1893)
Nebula reclamata (Prout, 1914)
Nebula salicata (Denis & Schiffermüller, 1775)
Nebula senectaria (Herrich-Schäffer, 1852)
Nebula tophaceata (Denis & Schiffermüller, 1775)
Nebula tshatkalensis (Viidalepp, 1988)
Nebula viduata (Staudinger, 1892)

References

Cidariini